Biothermia is the process of heating living tissue using non-ionizing radiation. Sources can include magnetic (inductive), electromagnetic (radiowaves), or conductive (organic materials).

See also
 Bioelectrogenesis
 Bioheat transfer
 Electroreception

Biomedical engineering
Heat transfer